The 2022 Porsche Mobil 1 Supercup was the 30th Porsche Supercup season. It began on 24 April at the Autodromo Enzo e Dino Ferrari, Italy and ended on 11 September at the Autodromo Nazionale di Monza, Italy, after eight races, all of which were support events for the 2022 Formula One season. It marked the first time that the series visited Circuit Paul Ricard.

Teams and drivers

Race calendar and results

Championship standings

Scoring system
Points were awarded to the top fifteen classified drivers in every race, using the following system:

In order for full points to be awarded, the race winner must complete at least 50% of the scheduled race distance. Half points are awarded if the race winner completes less than 50% of the race distance. In the event of a tie at the conclusion of the championship, a count-back system is used as a tie-breaker, with a driver's/constructor's best result used to decide the standings.

Guest drivers are ineligible to score points. If a guest driver finishes in first position, the second-placed finisher will receive 25 points. The same goes for every other points scoring position. So if three guest drivers end up placed fourth, fifth and sixth, the seventh-placed finisher will receive fourteen points and so forth - until the eighteenth-placed finisher receives the final point.

Drivers' Championship

Rookie Championship

Pro-Am Championship

Teams' Championship

Notes

References

External links
 

Porsche Supercup seasons
Porsche Supercup